Clendinning Provincial Park is a provincial park in British Columbia, Canada.  It surrounds the drainage of Clendinning Creek, which is a tributary of the Elaho River.  Its name is shared by the Clendinning Range, of which Mount Clendinning is the highest summit (there is also a Clendinning Lake in the same basin).

Established as a Canadian Protected Area on October 28, 1996, and made a provincial park by order-in-council on December 9, 1998, it occupies an area of 30,330 hectares.

References

Provincial parks of British Columbia
Pacific Ranges
Sea-to-Sky Corridor
1998 establishments in British Columbia
Protected areas established in 1998